Academia Raionala de Fotbal Criuleni Women's is a women's football club from Criuleni, Moldova. It plays in the country's top level league and won the championship for the first time in 2015–16. The team played the qualifying round of the 2016–17 UEFA Women's Champions League, earning a draw against Irish Wexford Youths. The team apparently then folded and did not return for the following season.

Titles
 Moldovan Championship: 2015–16

References

External links
Official Website

Women's football clubs in Moldova
Football clubs in Moldova